Smedjebackens FK is a Swedish football club located in Smedjebacken.

Background
Smedjebackens FK currently plays in Division 4 Dalarna which is the sixth tier of Swedish football. They play their home matches at the Herosvallen in Smedjebacken.

The club is affiliated to Dalarnas Fotbollförbund. Smedjebackens FK have competed in the Svenska Cupen on 10 occasions and have played 18 matches in the competition.

Season to season

Footnotes

External links
  Smedjebackens FK – Official website

Football clubs in Dalarna County
Association football clubs established in 1977
1977 establishments in Sweden